Fenton is a village in the South Kesteven district of Lincolnshire, England.

Fenton Grade I listed Anglican church is dedicated to All Saints. It has a crocketed spire and is mainly of Perpendicular and Decorated style, but retains a Norman north arcade. The chancel was rebuilt in 1838 and restored in 1875.

References

External links

"Fenton", Genuki.org.uk. Retrieved 28 July 2011

Villages in Lincolnshire
South Kesteven District